Engraulicypris bredoi or Mesobola bredoi is an East African species of freshwater fish in the family Cyprinidae. It is endemic to Lake Albert in Uganda and the Democratic Republic of the Congo. Its natural habitats are rivers, intermittent rivers, freshwater lakes, freshwater marshes, and inland deltas. It is threatened by habitat loss.

References

Engraulicypris
Fish described in 1945
Cyprinid fish of Africa